David Foster is a Canadian musician, record producer, composer, songwriter, and arranger.

Grammy Awards
The Grammy Awards are awarded annually by the National Academy of Recording Arts and Sciences in the United States for outstanding achievements in the record industry. Foster has won 16 awards from 47 nominations.

Academy Award

Academy Awards, also known as the Oscars, are awarded annually by the Academy of Motion Picture Arts and Sciences (AMPAS) to recognize excellence of professionals in the film industry, including directors, actors, and writers.

Golden Globe Award

Golden Globe Awards are awarded annually by the Hollywood Foreign Press Association (HFPA) to recognize excellence in film and television, both domestic and foreign.

References

Foster, David